Lleyton Hewitt was the defending champion, but lost to Philipp Kohlschreiber in the quarterfinals.
Kohlschreiber won the tournament, defeating Philipp Petzschner in an all-German final, the first in the tournament's history, after Petzschner retired in the second set at a score of 7–6, 2–0.

Seeds

Qualifying

Draw

Finals

Top half

Bottom half

External links
 ATP main draw
 ATP singles results

2011 Gerry Weber Open